Evarcha zimbabwensis is a jumping spider that lives in Zimbabwe and South Africa.

References

Salticidae
Spiders of Africa
Spiders described in 2008
Taxa named by Wanda Wesołowska